Obbicht en Papenhoven is a former municipality in the Dutch province of Limburg. It consisted of the villages Obbicht and Papenhoven, located on the river Meuse about 8 km northwest of Sittard.

Obbicht en Papenhoven merged with the municipality of Born in 1982. A small part merged with Stein.

References

Former municipalities of Limburg (Netherlands)
Sittard-Geleen
Stein, Limburg